Hypericum fissurale, known as cracked St. John's wort, is a flowering plant in the St. Johns's wort family (Hypericaceae) endemic to northeastern Turkey. It is considered critically endangered on the IUCN Red List due to its very limited distribution and declining population. It was first formally named by Jurij Nikolaewitch Woronow in 1912. It is a small perennial herb in the section Hypericum sect. Like most Hypericum species, it has flowers with five yellow petals and numerous stamens. Hypericum fissurale is closely related to Hypericum armenum.

References

fissurale
Endemic flora of Turkey